Michael D. West (born in Niles, Michigan on 28 April 1953) is an American biogerontologist, and a pioneer in stem cells, cellular aging and telomerase. He is the founder and CEO of AgeX Therapeutics,
a startup focused on the field of experimental gerontology.

Early life and education
West was born in Niles, Michigan, to a wealthy family which ran an automobile leasing business. After graduating from Niles Senior High School, West earned a BS in psychology from the Rensselaer Polytechnic Institute in 1976. He then returned to Niles to help run the family business before resuming academic studies. He earned an MS in biology from Andrews University in 1982. That same year, he joined the laboratory of Samuel Goldstein, a molecular gerontologist at the University of Arkansas at Little Rock, and began to research the molecular biology of aging. Following a clash with Goldstein over a series of experiments in which he demonstrated that results which Goldstein had published in Cell were experimental artifacts, he transferred to the Baylor College of Medicine, where he worked in the laboratory of another molecular gerontologist, James Smith, and graduated with a PhD in cell biology in 1989. He did postdoctoral research at the University of Texas Southwestern Medical Center.

Career
Prior to joining BioTime, West was chairman of the board, chief scientific officer and CEO of Advanced Cell Technology (ACT), another biotechnology company focused on stem cell research. ACT later changed its name to Ocata Therapeutics, and was acquired by Japanese pharmaceutical company Astellas Pharma for US$379M or $8.50 per share in February 2016.

Prior that, West was founder, director, and chief scientific officer of Geron, for which he secured venture capital investment from Kleiner Perkins Caufield & Byers, Venrock and Domain Associates. At Geron, West initiated and managed programs in telomere biology relating to aging, cancer and human embryonic stem cell technology.

West organized the first collaborative effort to isolate human pluripotent (embryonic) stem cells for the purpose of manufacturing products in regenerative medicine in collaboration with James Thomson at the University of Wisconsin at Madison, John Gearhart at Johns Hopkins School of Medicine, and Roger Pedersen at the University of California, San Francisco.

In their telomerase research, West and colleagues at Geron cloned the RNA component of telomerase and collaborated with Thomas Cech (winner of 1989 Nobel Prize in Chemistry), with whom they cloned the catalytic component of the enzyme telomerase, and sponsored collaborative research in the laboratory of Carol Greider, then at Cold Spring Harbor Laboratory. Geron published evidence of the role of telomerase in cancer and cell immortalization in collaboration with Woodring Wright and Jerry Shay at the University of Texas Southwestern Medical Center at Dallas.

For the company's Scientific and Clinical Advisory Board, he recruited Günter Blobel (winner of the 1999 Nobel Prize in Physiology), Leonard Hayflick, Carol Greider (winner of the 2009 Nobel Prize in Medicine), James Watson (winner of the 1962 Nobel Prize in medicine), and others.

West has been a keynote speaker at events including World Stem Cell and is associated with 146 patents in the United States, Australia, Japan and elsewhere.

Bibliography

Books
West has authored and co-edited books on topics including animal cloning, aging, biogerontology, stem cells, stem cell biology, and regenerative medicine.

 2002 Principles of Cloning 
 2003 The Immortal Cell, by Michael D. West, Doubleday 
 2004 Handbook of Stem Cells: Volume 1 Embryonic Stem Cells 
 2004 Handbook of Stem Cells: Volume 2 Adult and Fetal Stem Cells 
 2006 Essentials of Stem Cell Biology 
 2010 The Future of Aging 
 2010 The Future of Aging: Pathways to Human Life Extension

See also
 tissue engineering
 somatic cell nuclear transfer

References

External links
Dr. West's webpage
Audio: Dr. West interviewed on Bloomberg Radio's "The Hays Advantage" February 11, 2010

1953 births
Biogerontologists
21st-century American biologists
American technology chief executives
Living people
Life extensionists
People from Niles, Michigan
Rensselaer Polytechnic Institute alumni
Andrews University alumni
Baylor College of Medicine alumni